Ozleworth is a village and civil parish in Gloucestershire, England, approximately  south of Gloucester. It lies in the Cotswolds, an Area of Outstanding Natural Beauty.

History
It was listed as Osleworde in the Domesday Book of 1086.

Governance
Ozleworth is part of the Grumbolds Ash ward of the district of Cotswold and is currently represented by Councillor Carolyn Nicolle, a member of the Conservative Party. Ozleworth is part of the constituency of Cotswold, represented at parliament by Conservative MP Geoffrey Clifton-Brown. It was part of the South West England constituency of the European Parliament prior to Britain leaving the European Union in January 2020.

Geography
Ozleworth is in the county of Gloucestershire, and lies within the Cotswolds, a range of hills designated an Area of Outstanding Natural Beauty. Nearby villages include Alderley, Wortley, Tresham, Leighterton, Lasborough, Newington Bagpath, Owlpen, and Kingscote.

Newark Park

Newark Park is a National Trust property which was once a Tudor hunting lodge built by the Poyntz family, anciently feudal barons of Curry Mallet in Somerset, later of Iron Acton in Gloucestershire.

Church

The Norman church, which is dedicated to St. Nicholas of Myra, is known to have been in existence in 1131. It has a cruciform structure, with one bell. It has an unusual hexagonal tower located in the centre of the church between the nave and the chancel. The current nave and font were added in the early 13th century. Archaeological evidence suggests that there was no nave before this time and that the tower originally formed part of the western wall of the church. The churchyard is circular. No longer active, the church is looked after by the Churches Conservation Trust.

Notable people
English poet, translator and academic Charles Tomlinson lived in the village with his family. Bruce Chatwin, novelist and travel writer, lived in a farmhouse in the village.

References

External links

Villages in Gloucestershire
Cotswold District